Philosophy in Review, formerly Canadian Philosophical Reviews, is an English-language online open access journal, that specializes in the review of books about philosophy. It is published six times a year and covers all areas of and approaches to philosophy.

History
It started as a publication of Academic Printing and Publishing in 1981 by its first editor and publisher, Roger Shiner, and changed its name 1997. In 2006 editorship of Philosophy in Review passed to Jeffrey Foss of the University of Victoria, in British Columbia, Canada, who was succeeded in 2007 by David Scott, also of the University of Victoria. In 2010 the University of Victoria replaced Academic Printing and Publishing as the publisher of Philosophy in Review. The formal association of Philosophy in Review with the Philosophy Department at the University of Victoria ended when Taneli Kukkonen, then of the University of Otago, became editor. He was succeeded by Neil Levy of the University of Melbourne and Robert Piercey of the University of Regina.

Issues back to Volume 1, Number 1 (1981) are accessible online and can be searched by issue, author of review, and title or author of the book.

Editorial board
Robert Piercey (Editor)
 Inba Kehoe (Managing Editor)

Associate editors
 Margaret Cameron, University of Victoria
 Benjamin W. McCraw, University of South Carolina Upstate, United States
 Shane Jesse Ralston, Penn State Hazleton, United States
 James Young, University of Victoria, Canada

Former editors 
 David Scott, University of Victoria
 Taneli Kukkonen
 Neil Levy, The Florey Institute of Neuroscience and Mental Health, University of Melbourne
 Jeffrey Foss, Philosophy, University of Victoria, Canada
 Roger Shiner, University of British Columbia

External links
 PIR Web Site

Publications established in 1981
Philosophy journals
Contemporary philosophical literature
Book review magazines
1981 establishments in Canada
English-language journals
Creative Commons Attribution-licensed journals